Glinka is an old Polish surname. Notable people with the surname include:

 Dave Glinka (born 1941), American football player
 Dmitry Glinka (aviator) (1917–1979), Soviet flying ace
 Edward Janczewski-Glinka (1846–1918), Polish biologist
 Elizaveta Glinka (1962–2016), Russian humanitarian
 Fyodor Glinka (1786–1880), Russian poet and author
 Katarzyna Glinka (born 1977), Polish actress
 Małgorzata Glinka (born 1978), Polish volleyball player
 Marian Glinka (1943–2008), Polish actor
 Mikhail Glinka (1804–1857), Russian composer
 Sergey Glinka (1774–1847), Russian author
 Waldemar Glinka (born 1968), Polish long-distance runner
 Yuliana Glinka (1844–1918), Russian occultist

See also
 

Polish-language surnames
Russian-language surnames